Cireș may refer to the following places: 

 Cireș, the Romanian name for Cheresh, a commune in Chernivtsi Oblast, Ukraine
 rivers in Romania:
 Cireș, a tributary of the Almaș in Hunedoara County
 Cireș (Bâsca), a tributary of the Bâsca in Covasna County
 Cireș (Coțatcu), a tributary of the Coțatcu in Buzău County

See also 
 Cireșu (disambiguation)
 Valea Cireșului (disambiguation)